Keighley Rugby Union Football Club is a Rugby Union club based in Keighley, West Yorkshire, England. The club currently play in Yorkshire 1.

Club history 
Keighley R.U.F.C. (or the Keighlians Old Boys R.U.F.C. as it was originally named) was formed by a group of old boys of Keighley Grammar School in 1920. Its name was first changed to Keighlians R.U.F.C. and later to Keighley R.U.F.C. In the early years matches were played at a variety of venues in and around the town, before a more permanent playing area was secured on council land near to the gas works at Thwaites. In addition, for many years Keighley had a social club in Lord Street in the town centre.

The facilities at Thwaites were improved gradually over the years (surviving a near catastrophic fire in the 1960s) until finally the club moved to their present address at Utley in 1986, when Keighley played against Yorkshire to officially open the new ground. Among the Yorkshire team that day was former Keighley Colts player Martin Whitcombe who made a try scoring debut for the county against the club where he learnt to play rugby. Yorkshire went on that year to win the County Championship final at Twickenham.

The club now has playing facilities and a club house. In October 2017, the Keighley 1st XV pitch was replaced with an artificial grass pitch as part of the RFU's Rugby 365 scheme. Many outstanding players and impressive sides have been produced over the years, but the pinnacle of the club's achievements was in the 1947/8 season when it won both the Yorkshire Shield, and Yorkshire Cup competitions, beating Sheffield by 17 points to 0 in the Shield final at Otley and Otley by 14 points to 6 in the Cup final at Skipton. It is almost certain that this unprecedented feat will never be equalled.

The club field three senior sides on Saturdays and an under 17's side on Sundays, as well as a Veterans team that play several games throughout the season. In addition Keighley were one of the pioneers of mini rugby in Yorkshire in 1967 and now have a thriving junior section for all age groups from 7 years to 17 years.

With the formation of leagues in 1987, Keighley began life alongside Wharfedale RUFC and Rotherham RUFC in League North East One, where the team remained until reconstruction of leagues in 2000 placed Keighley in Yorkshire League One. After relegation in 2001, Keighley returned to Yorkshire League One in 2003/4 as League Two champions, where they remained until 2012. Following a second-place finish in Yorkshire 1's 2011/12 season, Keighley travelled to Alnwick RFC for a play-off against the Durham and Northumberland 1 runners-up. Keighley went on to record an 18–16 victory, gaining them promotion to North East 1. After narrowly missing out on North East 1 survival, Keighley dropped suffered a further relegation to Yorkshire 2. They returned to Yorkshire League One in 2015/16 as League Two runners-up.

Keighley RUFC's junior teams have produced several players who have gone on to have outstanding rugby careers in both rugby union and rugby league. Most recently, Ellie Kildunne, who made her international debut in England Women's 79–5 win over Canada.

Notable former players 

  Neil Marklew - Otley RUFC
 Gary Moorby (rugby League) world record transfer to St Helens R.F.C.
 Tom Rock
 Andy Rock
 Peter Roe (rugby league) Bradford Northern
 Frank Whitcombe Jr  Yorkshire Rugby Union
 Martin Whitcombe  Leicester Tigers & England 'B'
 David Jeanes Great Britain 1972 Rugby League World Cup winner 
 David Lister - Wharfedale RUFC & Yorkshire
 Ronnie Kelly - Sale RUFC, Harrogate RUFC & Yorkshire
 Sam Keighley
 Trevor Britten (scrum half RAF Germany 1960–61, nicknamed 'Dickie Jeeps')
 Ellie Kildunne - Gloucester-Hartpury Women's RFC, Wasps & Harlequins, England Women & England 7's

Club honours
Yorkshire Cup winners: 1948
Yorkshire Shield winners: 1948
North East 1 Runners Up: 1990-91
Yorkshire 2 Champions: 2002-03
Durham/Northumberland 1 v Yorkshire 1 Promotion Playoff Winners: 2011-12
Yorkshire 2 Runners Up: 2015-16
Aire-Wharfe Plate Winners 2017-18 & 2018-19
Yorkshire 2 Champions: 2021-22

References

External links 
 keighleyrufc.com

List of English rugby union teams

English rugby union teams
Sport in the City of Bradford
Keighley
Rugby clubs established in 1920